Israel returned at the Eurovision Song Contest 1981 held in Dublin, Ireland, after withdrawing from the 1980 contest because of National Day of Remembrance.

Their entry was Hakol Over Habibi with the song "Halayla" after they won the Israeli national final, Kdam Eurovision 1981. At Eurovision, the song came seventh, having received 56 points.

Before Eurovision

Kdam Eurovision 1981 
The Israel Broadcasting Authority (IBA) decided to replace the Israel Song Festival with a new competition designed to select a song for the contest. 

The final was held on 3 March 1981 in Jerusalem, and was hosted by Daniel Pe'er. The votes of nine regional juries across Israel decided the winner. Each place had a jury who awarded 12, 10, 8, 7, 6, 5, 4, 3, 2, 1 point(s) for their top twelve songs.

The winning entry was "Halayla", performed by Hakol Over Habibi and composed by Shuki Levy, with lyrics written by Shlomit Aharon, Yuval Dor.

At Eurovision
On the night of the final Hakol Over Habibi, performing as Habibi, performed 5th in the running order, following Luxembourg and preceding Denmark. Shlomit Aharon, the band's soloist, was in about 6–7 months pregnant at the contest. At the close of voting "Halayla" had received 56 points, placing Israel seventh of the 20 entries. The Israeli spokesperson revealing the result of the Israeli vote in the final was Dan Kaner.

Voting

References 

1981
Countries in the Eurovision Song Contest 1981
Eurovision